Federal elections were held in the Federation of Rhodesia and Nyasaland on 27 April 1962. Due to a boycott by all opposition parties, the ruling United Federal Party was the only party to contest the election.

Results
The UFP won 54 of the 57 seats, with 39 candidates returned unopposed. In the 18 contested seats, voter turnout was lower than 50%.

References

Federation of Rhodesia and Nyasaland election
Election
Elections in the Federation of Rhodesia and Nyasaland
Federation of Rhodesia and Nyasaland election
Election and referendum articles with incomplete results